Abraham Nii Attah (born 2 July 2002) is a Ghanaian actor, living in the United  States. He hails from the Ga–Dangme ethnic group in the Greater Accra Region of Ghana. He made his feature film debut in Beasts of No Nation (2015). For his leading role of child soldier Agu, he was awarded the Marcello Mastroianni Award for Best Young Actor at the 72nd Venice International Film Festival.

In 2017, he appeared in the Marvel Studios film Spider-Man: Homecoming.

Filmography

Film

References

External links
 

2002 births
21st-century Ghanaian male actors
Ghanaian male child actors
Ghanaian expatriates in the United States
Ghanaian male film actors
Independent Spirit Award for Best Male Lead winners
Living people
Marcello Mastroianni Award winners